Jeffrey William Anderson (26 April 1928 – 18 March 2014) was a Canadian music critic, journalist, and television and radio producer.

Background
Born in Winnipeg, Anderson was the son of English-born composer W. H. Anderson and the brother of soprano and actress Evelyne Anderson. He earned a Bachelor of Arts in 1951 from the University of Winnipeg and a Master of Philosophy in history from the University of London in 1960. Although not a musician by profession, he studied both the organ and piano with Hugh Bancroft and is recognized as an authority on British composers.

Career
From 1951 to 1953 Anderson was an employee of Boosey & Hawkes in the London office of their promotions department. In 1959-1960 and 1966-1968 he worked as a music critic for the Winnipeg Free Press. In 1960 he became a music producer in both radio and television for the Canadian Broadcasting Corporation. For CBC Television he produced the 1963 broadcast of Gustav Holst's Savitri and the TV series Recital. From 1968 to 1972 he served as the CBC's program representative in England. He then returned to Canada to become supervisor of radio program evaluation for CBC Radio in Toronto in 1973. He left that post to work as the CBC's national supervisor of radio arts from 1975 to 1977. He then worked as an executive music producer for CBC Radio from 1977 to 1982. From 1983 to 1990 he was a faculty member of the Graduate School of Journalism at the University of Western Ontario. After 1990 he worked as a freelance journalist in Winnipeg. He died aged 85 on 18 March 2014.

References

1928 births
2014 deaths
Alumni of the University of London
University of Winnipeg alumni
Academic staff of the University of Western Ontario
Canadian Broadcasting Corporation people
Canadian male journalists
Canadian music critics
Journalists from Manitoba
Musicians from Winnipeg
Canadian people of English descent
Canadian radio producers
Canadian television producers
20th-century Canadian male musicians